Evenwood is a village in County Durham, in England. It is situated to the south west of Bishop Auckland.  It is in the civil parish of Evenwood and Barony, which has a population of 2,534 falling to 2,455 at the 2011 Census.

A former coal mining village, the major pit, Randolph Colliery with its  associated coke ovens, was worked between 1893 and 1962, and at its peak in 1914 employed over 1000 men.

Governance
An electoral ward in the name of Evenwood exists. This ward stretches west to Woodland with a total population of 8,114.

References

External links

Villages in County Durham